São Paulo Forum (FSP), also known as the Foro de São Paulo, is a conference of left-wing political parties and other organizations from the Americas, primarily Latin America and the Caribbean. It was launched by the Workers' Party of Brazil in 1990 in the city of São Paulo.

The Forum of São Paulo was constituted in 1990, when the Brazilian Workers' Party approached other parties and social movements of Latin America and the Caribbean with the objective of debating the new international scenario after the fall of the Berlin Wall and the consequences of the implementation of what were taken as neoliberal policies adopted at the time by contemporary right-leaning governments in the region, the stated main objective of the conference being to argue for alternatives to neoliberalism.

The first meeting held in São Paulo in July 1990 was attended by members of 48 parties and organizations from Latin American and the Caribbean. The original name given to the meeting was Meeting of Left and Anti-imperialist Parties and Organizations of Latin America. Since the 1991 meeting in Mexico City, it started being alternately called Foro de São Paulo in reference to the location of the first meeting. Subsequent meetings have hosted by many of the parties throughout the region.

Political stance 
According to FSP, more than 100 parties and political organizations participate in its conferences today.  Their political positions vary across a wide spectrum, which includes: social-democratic parties, left-wing grass-roots labor and social movements inspired by the Catholic Church, ethnic and environmentalist groups, anti-imperialist and nationalist organizations, communist parties, and armed guerrilla forces. The latter, however, is true only so far as one is willing to think of the Revolutionary Armed Forces of Colombia as an actual member of the FSP, when actually the FARC, although never formally banned from the Forum, have been barred from participating in its meetings as early as 2005, when they were refused admittance to that year's meeting of the FSP in São Paulo.

These groups differ on a range of topics which go from the use of armed force in revolutions to the support of representative democracy. The Communist Party of Cuba, for example, has adopted a single-party system for decades, while Brazil's Workers' Party (PT) supports and participates in a multiparty system. These differences grant special relevance to FSP's final declarations, released at the end of each conference, which state the collective position of its members.

Ever since FSP's first meeting (1990), the Declaration which was approved expressed the participants' "willingness to renew leftist and socialist thought, to reaffirm its emancipating character, to correct mistaken conceptions, and to overcome all expressions of bureaucratism and all absence of true social and massive democracy."

The first Declaration manifests "an active compromise with the validity of human rights, of democracy and of popular sovereignty as strategic values, which place the constant challenge of leftist, socialist and progressive forces renewing their thoughts and actions."

At the second conference (Mexico, 1991), FSP expanded its objectives to add the proposal of working toward Latin American integration, an interchange of experiences, the discussion of the political left's differences and searching for consensus in action.  The following conferences reinstate the participants' willingness to exchange experiences and develop a dialogue, while at the regional and continental level FSP's influence grows, with some of its members achieving electoral success and their candidates reaching the presidency of many countries.

During the early 1990s, the FSP was seen by some as expressing the emergence of a new Latin American leftist paradigm: non-authoritarian, de-militarized and grassroots-friendly. As others have noted, however, there is a marked contradiction between the fiery and quasi-revolutionary rhetoric about "socialism of the 21st century" indulged in sometimes by many FSP's leaders, and the plain fact that the positions of power held by such leaders depend, on most cases, on their holding positions in governments which have emerged through the electoral road. In a statement made in 2008 in Lima, before a gathering of Peruvian businessmen, however, Brazil's President Lula would declare, approvingly, that the FSP had "educated" the Left in the understanding of the existence of possibilities of running for elections and gaining power through the democratic way – a declaration that prompted a comment from AFP, reproduced at the Rede Globo site, to the effect that the hallmark of FSP's activities had been its "very moderate" character.

Nevertheless, almost since its inception, the FSP has been the target of criticism from the right in the United States and Latin America, especially in Brazil, describing it as an organization promoting terrorism and/or a revival of communism, something regarded even by mainstream conservatives as unfounded and "exaggerated to say the least". The allegedly subversive character of the Foro's activities, however, was revived during the 2010 Brazilian presidential election campaign, as the vice-presidential candidate in the José Serra ticket, Antônio Pedro de Siqueira Indio da Costa, denounced repeatedly the supposed connection, by way of the Foro, between the Brazilian Workers' Party and the FARC. Alternatively, the Foro is seen also as more than a simple regular gathering, in that policies that had been advised by it came to be actively implemented later – such as the strengthening of Mercosur, or the setting up of Unasur – but that the Foro was better understood as a "brainstorming organization", a "think-tank for politicians". 

During the fifth meeting (Montevideo, 1995) a dispute arose about the attendance of the Movimiento Bolivia Libre, which was charged, in a motion presented by ten parties, led by Argentina's Partido Obrero, of support to the repressive actions of the neoliberal government of Gonzalo Sánchez de Lozada in Bolivia. The refusal of the motion by the Foro's plenum led to the permanent withdrawal of Partido Obrero from the meeting. Partido Obrero had already declared itself in opposition to the Foro's positions, having previously made public a note in which it protested against the change in the official name of the organization, as "offering evidence of putting, in the place of actual making of common policies, a kind of purely academic workshop, [a sure sign] of conscious depoliticization leading eventually to the cover-up of rightist policies".

During the 14th meeting in El Salvador, it was resolved that the Foro should organize a number of subordinate organizations and facilities: an electronic bulletin on the Net, a politic-cultural festival, an electoral observatory and a cadre school.

In the final declaration of the FSP's 15th meeting in Montevideo, there is a reinstatement and updating of the Foro's goals: to aid "the progressive forces in the continent who are in power and strive in various ways to build projects which – according to each country's particular characteristics – allow them to face the main problems generated by neoliberalism" – something which added to the statement made at the same time by Belela Herrera, International Relations chargé of the Uruguayan Broad Front, that issues like ecology, exclusion, racism and xenophobia had added themselves inseparably to the Left's traditional agenda. The meeting also debated the ongoing Colombian armed conflict, which prompted a declaration by the International Relations Secretary of the Brazilian Workers' Party, Valter Pomar, who exposed what in his view was the Foro's general stance towards the current Colombian situation: "In Colombia we have a military confrontation that has been going on for decades, having as its players the [Colombian] State, as well as the paramilitary and insurgent forces. The Foro is interested in achieving peace and in having a negotiated process towards reaching this goal".

In the 16th meeting, which opened on 20 August 2009 in Mexico City, the Foro was expected to concentrate discussion on the 2009 Honduran constitutional crisis as well as engaging in efforts to the restoration of the deposed Honduran president Manuel Zelaya. The Vice president of the Mexican Senate, Yeidckol Polevnsky, has invited the Honduran MP Silvia Ayala, as a member of the Democratic Unification Party and leader of the manifestations in support of Zelaya held in San Pedro Sula, to attend the meeting – something that attracted the fury of the pro-government Honduran press.

The ongoing meeting in Mexico will also be the first to organize a parallel youth meeting, where member parties will discuss the impact of the global economic crisis on Latin American youth and the responses that could be offered to it.

In January 2010, the European Left – the broad front of European national Left parties formed in view of a common stand in European politics – at the opening of its Third Congress, expressed its interest in strengthening ties with the FSP.

In September 2021, the Democratic Socialists of America applied for membership.

Participants

In government 
The following countries are currently being governed by leaders and member parties of the Foro de São Paulo:
  – Alberto Fernández (Justicialist Party/Frente de Todos) (2019–present)
  – Luis Arce (Movement for Socialism) (2020–present)
  – Luiz Inácio Lula da Silva (Workers' Party/Brazil of Hope) (2023–present)
  – Gabriel Boric (Apruebo Dignidad) (2022–present)
  - Gustavo Petro (Historic Pact for Colombia) (2022–present)
  – Miguel Díaz-Canel (Communist Party of Cuba) (2018–present)
  – Luis Abinader (Modern Revolutionary Party) (2020–present)
  – Xiomara Castro (Liberty and Refoundation) (2022–present)
  – Andrés Manuel López Obrador (National Regeneration Movement) (2018–present)
  – Daniel Ortega (Sandinista National Liberation Front) (2007–present)
  – Laurentino Cortizo (Democratic Revolutionary Party) (2019–present)
  – Philip J. Pierre (Saint Lucia Labour Party) (2021–present)
  – Nicolás Maduro (United Socialist Party of Venezuela) (2013–present)

Aligned governments 
The following centre-left and left-wing parties or coalitions, who are currently in government, even though not members of the forum, maintain good relations and have been integrated with the members of the FSP:
  – Unity Labour Party (2001–present)
  – Izquierda Unida (2020–present)

As main opposition 
The following countries had members of the Foro de São Paulo as the main opposition parties in their parliaments and/or were the second electoral force in the past elections:
  – Dominican Liberation Party
  – Broad Front

Formerly ruling party or coalition partners 
  – 2003–2015 – Front for Victory, coalition with participation of the left-wing faction of the Justicialist Party
 – 2017–2021 – Democratic Network, coalition with participation of the People's Electoral Movement and Proud and Respected People
  – 2003–2016 – Workers' Party (2010–2016 as part of the coalition With the Strength of the People)
  – 2007–2016 – Democratic Labour Party (as a junior government partner; 2010–2016 as part of the coalition With the Strength of the People)
  – 2014–2018 – New Majority, coalition with participation of the Socialist Party, Citizen Left and Communist Party
 – 2010–2016 – Sovereign People, coalition with participation of the Movement for the Future of Curaçao and Partido MAN
  – 2004–2020 – Dominican Liberation Party
  – 2007–2021 – PAIS Alliance
  – 2009–2019 – Farabundo Martí National Liberation Front
  – 2008–2012 – Party for a Country of Solidarity and Revolutionary Febrerista Party in coalitions Patriotic Alliance for Change (2008–2010) and Guasú Front (2010–2012) 
  – 2011–2016 – Peruvian Nationalist Party, Peruvian Communist Party and Socialist Party of Peru in the coalition Peru Wins
  – 2021-2022 – Free Peru
 – 2010–2012 – Movement for Social Justice, coalition with participation of the United National Congress, Congress of the People, Tobago Organisation of the People and National Joint Action Committee
  – 2005–2020 – Broad Front

Official members

Former members

Meetings and organization
Meetings were held in São Paulo (1990), Mexico City (1991), Managua (1992), Havana (1993), Montevideo (1995), San Salvador (1996), Porto Alegre (1997), Mexico City (1998), Managua (2000), Havana (2001), Antigua Guatemala (2002), Quito (2003), São Paulo (2005), San Salvador (2007), Montevideo (2008), Mexico City (2009), Buenos Aires (2010), Managua (2011), Caracas (2012), São Paulo (2013), La Paz (2014), Mexico City (2015), San Salvador (2016), Managua (2017), Havana (2018) and Caracas (2019).

The Foro's chief authority is its meeting itself. Between meetings, the Foro is represented by an Executive Group (Grupo de Trabalho) composed of a sample of its overall membership that usually meets thrice a year as well as by an Executive Secretariat (Secretariado Executivo).

See also
Pink Tide

References

External links
Website of Foro de São Paulo

 
Left-wing internationals
International political organizations
Political party assemblies
International organizations based in the Americas
International Socialist Organisations
Socialism of the 21st century